Anaimalayanpatty is a village under Uthamapalayam Taluk, Theni District, Tamil Nadu, India. The population of village would be around 8,000.

Villages in Theni district